Susan Buckingham Merwin (November 21, 1874 – May 6, 1923) was an American educator, publisher, and superintendent of the Kentucky School for the Blind.

Early life 
Merwin was born in Louisville, Kentucky, one of the five children of Samuel Miles Merwin and Mary Irvine Merwin. Her father was from Connecticut, and her mother was from Pennsylvania. She attended Girls' High School in Louisville, and trained at a teacher in the city's normal school.

Career 
Merwin taught at the Kentucky School for the Blind beginning in 1895, and was superintendent of the school from 1913 to her death in 1923. She was the second woman in the United States to become superintendent of a state school for the blind. She started Boy Scout and Girl Scout troops at the school, and wrote articles about the school's work. She was elected vice-president of the American Association of Instructors of the Blind in 1915. She also served as president of the Louisville Council of Social Workers.

Beginning in 1919, Merwin was also secretary of the American Printing House for the Blind, and associate editor of the national magazine Outlook for the Blind. She served on the Commission on Uniform Type for the Blind. She testified before a Congressional committee in 1920, explaining the work of the American Printing House for the Blind, and its need for federal funding.

Personal life 
Merwin died in 1923, from pneumonia and influenza, aged 48 years, in Louisville.

References

External links 

 

1874 births
1923 deaths
People from Louisville, Kentucky
School superintendents in Kentucky
Educators from Kentucky
Kentucky women in education
19th-century American educators
20th-century American educators
Educators of the blind
Deaths from influenza
Deaths from pneumonia in Kentucky
19th-century American women educators
20th-century American women educators